Perry Filkins (born April 3, 1988) is an American professional mixed martial artist who competed in Bellator's Middleweight division.

Background
Filkins is originally from Millington, Michigan and came from a dysfunctional home. His father was a truck driver, so as a result the young Filkins would often have to fend for himself from a young age. Athletic, Filkins played various sports at Millington High School, being the quarterback for the football team while also competing in wrestling. Filkins also enjoyed BMX and won a national title in the sport in 2007. After graduating, a former wrestling coach opened an MMA gym and invited Filkins to train. After only four months of training, Filkins made his debut in mixed martial arts.

Mixed martial arts career

Early career
Filkins compiled an amateur record of 5-1 before making his professional debut in 2010 and won via TKO. After another fight with the same result, Filkins was handed his first professional loss via unanimous decision.

Filkins soon bounced back, however, winning his next four fights via TKO with one of the wins being over Strikeforce veteran, Louis Taylor. With a record of 6-1, Filkins was invited to compete in the Bellator Fighting Championships.

Bellator MMA
Filkins made his debut for Bellator on November 16, 2012 at Bellator 81 against German striker Jonas Billstein and won via unanimous decision.

Filkins was expected to face Dan Cramer at Bellator 98 on September 7, 2013 in the quarterfinal of Bellator's Season Nine Middleweight Tournament. However, Cramer withdrew from the bout and Filkins instead faced Jeremy Kimball. Filkins won in the third and final round via rear-naked choke submission. Filkins was expected to face Brennan Ward in the semifinal at Bellator 102 on October 4, 2013. However, Filkins pulled out of the bout due to a torn PCL. Filkins was removed from the tournament and Ward instead faced Joe Pacheco in the semifinal.

Filkins next faced Dan Cramer on September 5, 2014 at Bellator 123. He lost the fight by unanimous decision.

Mixed martial arts record

|-
|Loss
|align=center|8–2
|Dan Cramer
|Decision (unanimous)
|Bellator 123
|
|align=center|3
|align=center|5:00
|Uncasville, Connecticut, United States
|
|-
|Win
|align=center| 8–1
|Jeremy Kimball
|Submission (rear-naked choke)
|Bellator 98
|
|align=center|3
|align=center|4:18
|Uncasville, Connecticut, United States
|
|-
|Win
|align=center| 7–1
|Jonas Billstein
|Decision (unanimous)
|Bellator 81
|
|align=center|3
|align=center|5:00
|Kingston, Rhode Island, United States
|
|-
|Win
|align=center| 6–1
|Louis Taylor
|TKO (punches)
|CZ 40: Kicking It XL at The Rock
|
|align=center|2
|align=center|4:02
|Salem, New Hampshire, United States
|
|-
|Win
|align=center| 5–1
|Robert Burton
|TKO (punches)
|CZ 39: MMA Smackdown at The Rock
|
|align=center|1
|align=center|0:15
|Salem, New Hampshire, United States
|
|-
|Win
|align=center| 4–1
|Chris Haggerty
|TKO (punches)
|GFL 12: Smith vs. Stone
|
|align=center|1
|align=center|4:09
|Dover, New Hampshire, United States
|
|-
|Win
|align=center| 3–1
|Wilfred Santiago Jr.
|TKO (knees and punches)
|CZ 37: Kicking It at The Rock
|
|align=center|2
|align=center|2:53
|Salem, New Hampshire, United States
|
|-
|Loss
|align=center| 2–1
|Cornelius Murray
|Decision (unanimous)
|CZ 36: Smashing on The Rock
|
|align=center|3
|align=center|5:00
|Salem, New Hampshire, United States
|
|-
|Win
|align=center| 2–0
|Chris Cape
|TKO (punches)
|Triumph Fighter 4: Hostile
|
|align=center|1
|align=center|3:01
|Milford, New Hampshire, United States
|
|-
|Win
|align=center| 1–0
|Nate Woodger
|TKO (punches)
|Triumph Fighter 3: Havoc
|
|align=center|2
|align=center|4:12
|Milford, New Hampshire, United States
|

See also
 List of Bellator MMA alumni

References

American male mixed martial artists
Mixed martial artists utilizing wrestling
1988 births
Living people
People from Tuscola County, Michigan
Mixed martial artists from Michigan